Fort Mountain can refer to

 Fort Mountain (Carroll County, Arkansas) , 
 Fort Mountain (Izard County, Arkansas) , 
 Fort Mountain (Connecticut) , 
 Fort Mountain (Calaveras County, California) , 
 Fort Mountain (Lassen County, California) , 
 Fort Mountain (Shasta County, California) , 
 Fort Mountain (Murray County, Georgia) , 
 Fort Mountain (Union County, Georgia) , 
 Fort Mountain (Maine) , 
 Fort Mountain (New Hampshire) , 
 Fort Mountain (British Columbia) , 

It is a variant name for
 Massanutten Mountain, Virginia , 
 Square Butte (Cascade County, Montana) ,